Novodarivka is an urban-type settlement in the Dovzhansk Raion of the Luhansk Oblast of Ukraine. Population:

References

Urban-type settlements in Dovzhansk Raion